The 1996 United States presidential election in Rhode Island took place on November 5, 1996, as part of the 1996 United States presidential election. Voters chose four representatives, or electors to the Electoral College, who voted for president and vice president.

Rhode Island was won by President Bill Clinton (D) over Senator Bob Dole (R-KS), with Clinton winning 59.71% to 26.82% by a margin of 32.89%. Billionaire businessman Ross Perot (Reform Party of the United States of America-TX) finished in third, with 11.20% of the popular vote.

As of 2020, this was the most recent presidential election in which the town of Scituate voted for a Democrat.

Results

By county

See also
 United States presidential elections in Rhode Island

References

Rhode Island
1996
1996 Rhode Island elections